Max van Manen (born 1942) is a Dutch-born Canadian scholar who specializes in phenomenological research methods and pedagogy. There are several interesting publications to conduct phenomenology of practice. He is an emeritus professor in the Faculty of Education at the University of Alberta, where he is also a Distinguished Scholar at the International Institute for Qualitative Methodology.

Books 

 Tone of Teaching (1986)
 Researching Lived Experiences: Human Science for an Action Sensitive Pedagogy (1990)
 The Tact of Teaching: The Meaning of Pedagogical Thoughtfulness (1991)
 Childhood’s Secrets: Intimacy, Privacy, and the Self Reconsidered (1996), with Bas Levering
 Writing in the Dark: Phenomenological Studies in Interpretive Inquiry (2003)
 Phenomenology of Practice: Meaning-Giving Methods in Phenomenological Research and Writing (2014)
 Pedagogical Tact: Knowing What to Do When You Don’t Know What to Do (2015)

References

1942 births
Living people
Canadian philosophers
Manen, Max van
Hermeneutists
Manen, Max van
Phenomenologists
University of Alberta alumni
Academic staff of the University of Alberta